Eldorado do Carajás is a municipality in the state of Pará in the Northern region of Brazil, known for the massacre that occurred there, in 1996, when 19 landless peasants were killed by police troops.

See also
 Eldorado do Carajás massacre
List of municipalities in Pará

References

Municipalities in Pará